This is a list of people associated with Kyoto University in Japan. Several notable individuals have either studied or worked on the faculty of Kyoto University.

Nobel Laureates

Fields Medalists 
Heisuke Hironaka - mathematician, Fields Medalist in 1970
Shigefumi Mori - mathematician, Fields Medalist in 1990

Literature

Politicians

Science

Other

References

See also 
 List of Nobel laureates affiliated with Kyoto University
 :Category:Kyoto University alumni
 :Category:Academic staff of Kyoto University

People
Kyoto University people